Astor is an unincorporated community and census-designated place (CDP) in Lake County, Florida, United States, located on the west side of the St. Johns River between Lake George and Lake Dexter. The community straddles State Road 40, with the community of Volusia in Volusia County across the St. Johns to the east and Astor Park to the west. The population was 1,556 at the 2010 census. It is part of the Orlando–Kissimmee–Sanford Metropolitan Statistical Area.

Geography

Astor is located in northern Lake County at  (29.1639, -81.5346).

Astor lies entirely within the boundaries of the Ocala National Forest.

History
The Astor area and much of the land along the St. Johns River was inhabited by Timucua natives prior to settlement by Europeans. Early attempts at settlement included an English trading post in 1763, and in 1822 a plantation growing sugar cane and oranges was established by Jewish immigrant Moses Elias Levy. By 1838 the Seminole Wars had begun and the United States government established Fort Butler to defend the river as the primary route of transportation inside Florida. These earliest efforts at settlement all met with failure due to war or disease, and until the 1870s the area was largely deserted.

New settlers arrived by steamboat to the town which Astor had endowed with a church, schoolhouse, botanical garden, and free cemetery. William Astor also built a hotel, saw mill, and eventually a railroad, the St. Johns and Lake Eustis Railway, which headed southwest towards the communities of Eustis and Leesburg. A few miles to the west of town, a satellite community called Astor Park grew up along the shore of Lake Schimmerhorn (named for Astor's wife, Caroline Schermerhorn Astor). Over the next twenty years Astor saw his town grow, but the Manhattan name never caught on. When William Astor died in 1892, the town was officially renamed "Astor" in his honor.

John Jacob Astor IV inherited his father William's estate and continued to promote the town and their business interests in Florida. Following his demise in the sinking of the RMS Titanic in 1912, the estate passed to his son, Vincent. William Vincent Astor was not interested in his grandfather's Florida enterprises, and so the Astor family's interests in the area were sold. This, combined with a severe decline in steamboat travel on the St. Johns due to increased availability of rail travel, signaled the end of the town's prosperity and prominence. The first Astor Bridge was built in 1926; by 1928, Astor's hotel had burned down and the railroad was abandoned, leaving Astor without telephone or telegraph service for the next few decades.

Today the community of Astor is largely reliant upon tourism, and is a popular spot for winter visitors from the north and for fishing, hunting, and boating enthusiasts.

Demographics

As of the census of 2000, there were 1,487 people, 641 households, and 444 families residing in the CDP. The racial makeup of the CDP was 96.97% White, 0.67% African American, 0.81% Native American, 0.07% Pacific Islander, 1.21% from other races, and 0.27% from two or more races. Hispanic or Latino of any race were 9.15% of the population.

There were 641 households, out of which 20.3% had children under the age of 18 living with them, 55.2% were married couples living together, 7.6% had a female householder with no husband present, and 30.7% were non-families. 24.3% of all households were made up of individuals, and 12.6% had someone living alone who was 65 years of age or older.  The average household size was 2.32 and the average family size was 2.68.

In the CDP, the population was spread out, with 19.9% under the age of 18, 5.2% from 18 to 24, 20.4% from 25 to 44, 30.6% from 45 to 64, and 23.8% who were 65 years of age or older.  The median age was 48 years. For every 100 females, there were 97.0 males.  For every 100 females age 18 and over, there were 93.7 males.

The median income for a household in the CDP was $31,284, and the median income for a family was $31,786. Males had a median income of $22,074 versus $20,949 for females. The per capita income for the CDP was $14,467.  About 9.2% of families and 12.5% of the population were below the poverty line, including 15.3% of those under age 18 and 6.7% of those age 65 or over.

Notable People 

 Moses Elias Levy
 Robert M. McTureous Jr.

References

Astor family
Census-designated places in Lake County, Florida
Greater Orlando
Populated places on the St. Johns River
Census-designated places in Florida
1874 establishments in Florida
Populated places established in 1874
Unincorporated communities in Florida